Wheatfield — A Confrontation is a 1982 artwork by conceptual artist Agnes Denes. The work, a two-acre wheatfield, was grown on empty landfill next to the World Trade Center.

Installation
Wheatfield — A Confrontation was commissioned by the Public Art Fund. The work was planted on 1 May 1982. Denes, two assistants, and rotating volunteers maintained the field for four months. Denes and others took actions to protect the crop such as spraying to prevent mildew after the wheat developed a fungus. They harvested the wheat on 16 August 1982.

The work has been referred to as Denes' best known.

External links
Article on the artwork in The Guardian, 18 July, 2022

References

Installation art works
Land art
Conceptual art
The Battery (Manhattan)
1982 works